Furen Point (‘Nos Furen’ \'nos 'fu-ren\) is the rocky point on Oscar II Coast, Graham Land in Antarctica formed by an offshoot of Yordanov Nunatak, and situated on the northwest coast of Borima Bay.  It was formed as a result of the disintegration of Larsen Ice Shelf in the area in 2002 and the subsequent retreat of Jorum Glacier and Minzuhar Glacier.

The feature is named after the settlement of Furen in northwestern Bulgaria.

Location

Maps
 Antarctic Digital Database (ADD). Scale 1:250000 topographic map of Antarctica. Scientific Committee on Antarctic Research (SCAR), 1993–2016.

References
 Furen Point. SCAR Composite Antarctic Gazetteer.
 Bulgarian Antarctic Gazetteer. Antarctic Place-names Commission. (details in Bulgarian, basic data in English)

External links
 Furen Point. Copernix satellite image

Headlands of Graham Land
Oscar II Coast
Bulgaria and the Antarctic